The Circuit Jules Tacheny Mettet is a  motorsport racing circuit in Mettet, Wallonia (Belgium),  southeast of Charleroi. The circuit was finalized in 2010 near the old street circuit.

History

Motorcycle racing
During the early 1920s motorcycle racers started to race around a circuit composed of local streets surrounding the Belgian city of Mettet. The first motorcycle Grand Prix Entre Sambre et Meuse was held in 1928. Belgian driver Albert Breslau won the first race on an AJS. The last edition of the original motorcycle Grand Prix of Mettet was run in 1937. After World War II Jules Tacheny was appointed president of the Royal Motor Union de l’Entre Sambre et Meuse (RMUESM). Tacheny won the Senior category of the first post-war version of the Grand Prix in 1946. The overall Grand Prix was won by Roger Laurent on a Norton.

In 1947 the FIM motorcycle racing governing body decided each country could only host one Grand Prix. Therefore, the title Belgian motorcycle Grand Prix was awarded to the race at Spa-Francorchamps. The race at Mettet was renamed Circuit de l'Entre Sambre et Meuse in 1947 and the race was again renamed to "Grand Trophy". Legendary motor and auto racing driver John Surtees won the race in 1958 in the 350cc and 500cc classes.

Between 1972 and 1979 the street circuit hosted the Mettet 1000 km motorcycle endurance race. Jean-Claude Chemarin was the most successful rider of the Mettet endurance race, winning the event four times. The circuit also hosted the Belgian round of the 1975 Formula 750 championship won by Patrick Pons. The street circuit was last used in 2006.

Formula 2
The RMUESM hosted non-championship Formula Two races twice, in 1950 and 1951. In 1950 the first edition Grandee Trophée Entre Sambre et Meuse was held at the  street circuit. Of the 24 competitors only ten drivers made it to the finish. Robert Manzon won the final race in his factory entered Simca Gordini Type 15. Stirling Moss and Lance Macklin finished second and third in for HW Motors. The second edition of the Grandee Trophée was again won by Manzon. Gordini completed the podium with factory drivers André Simon and Maurice Trintignant finishing second and third.

Development of the new circuit
The new  permanent circuit was opened on 12 March 2010. In the initial years Mettet was mostly used by motorcycle racers. The track was first used in the FIA European Rallycross Championship and FIA World Rallycross Championship in 2014.

Lap Records

Motorcycle Grand Prix

Formula 2 results

FIA World Rallycross Championship

Since 2019 the World RX of Belgium was renamed Spa World RX of Benelux and takes place at Circuit de Spa-Francorchamps.

References

External links 

Circuit Jules Tacheny Mettet official site

Jules Tacheny Mettet
Sports venues in Namur (province)
World Rallycross circuits
Mettet